Daur Vadimovich Kove (born 15 March 1979) was the Minister for Foreign Affairs of Abkhazia from 2016 until 2021.

Early life
Kove was born on 15 March 1979 in Sukhumi. In 2000, he graduated in jurisprudence from the Bashkir State University.

Career
From 1995 until 2000, Kove was assistant to the Representation of Abkhazia in the Republic of Bashkortostan, and from 2000 until 2009, plenipotentiary representative.

In 2005, Kove additionally became head of the International Department of the Foreign Ministry. In 2006, he was appointed Deputy Minister. On 9 September 2010, Kobe was appointed Head of the Cabinet Office under Prime Minister Sergei Shamba, to succeed Zurab Adleiba who had been appointed as Chairman of the State Repatriation Committee. A year later, Kove was not re-appointed under Prime Minister Leonid Lakerbaia.

In 2011, Kove became teacher in international law at the Sukhumi Open Institute. From June to November 2012, he was head of the legal department of the Office for Emergency Situations and from 2013 until 2014, advisor to the head of the Office for Emergency Situations. Between 2012 and 2014, Kove additionally served as Deputy Director of the Abkhazian branch of the Institute for Eurasian Studies. In November 2013, Kove became advisor to the Speaker of the People's Assembly.

In November 2014, following the election of President Raul Khajimba, Kove was appointed head of the Presidential Protocol Office. On 4 October 2016, Kove was appointed Foreign Minister to succeed Viacheslav Chirikba. In November 2021, he was replaced by Inal Ardzinba.

See also
List of foreign ministers in 2017
List of current foreign ministers

References

External links

1979 births
Living people
Ministers for Foreign Affairs of Abkhazia
People from Sukhumi
Chiefs of the Cabinet Staff of Abkhazia